A splinter is a sharp fragment of material, usually wood, metal, or fibreglass.

Splinter may also refer to:

 Splinter group, a smaller division of an organization or movement
 Splinter, in contract bridge, a splinter bid meaning a suit with one card or no cards
 Splinter, a type of cell in a clandestine cell system
 Splinter, a defunct news and opinion website (2017-2019)

People
 Splinter Johnson (1920–2002), American basketball player
 Tracy Splinter (born 1971), German-South African writer who has been missing since 2016

Entertainment
 Splinter (novel), a 2007 science fiction novel by British writer Adam Roberts
 Splinters (revue), a British revue first staged in the First World WAr

Film and television

Film

Splinter
 Splinter (2006 film) by director Michael D. Olmos
 Splinter (2008 film), a horror film

Splinters
 Splinters (1929 film), a UK musical comedy film based on the 1915 revue
 Splinters in the Navy (1931) a sequel of "Splinters (1929 film)"
 Splinters in the Air (1937) a sequel of "Splinters (1929 film)"
 Splinters (2018 film), a Canadian drama film

Television
Splinter (The Walking Dead), an episode of The Walking Dead
 "Splinter", an episode of the fifth season of Smallville

Music
 Splinter (band), an English 2-men band
 Splinter (Sneaker Pimps album) (1999)
 Splinter (The Offspring album) (2003)
 "Splinter", a song by Sevendust from album Cold Day Memory (2010)
 Splinter (Songs from a Broken Mind), an album by Gary Numan (2013)
 "Splinter", a song by Man Overboard from Heavy Love (2015)

Fictional characters
 Splinter (Teenage Mutant Ninja Turtles), a character from the Teenage Mutant Ninja Turtles series
 Splinter, an insect-like creature in the Nintendo game Metroid Prime 2: Echoes
 Splinter, Woody Woodpecker's niece

See also
 
 
 Giovanni di ser Giovanni Guidi (1406–1486), Italian painter known as Lo Scheggia ("the Splinter")
 Splint (disambiguation)